Swalmen is a railway station in Swalmen, Netherlands. The station was opened in 1862 and is located on the Maastricht–Venlo railway, also known as the Staatslijn E. Train services are operated by Arriva.

Train services
The following local train services call at this station:
Stoptrein: Nijmegen–Venlo–Roermond

Bus service
66: Venlo–Tegelen–Belfeld–Reuver–Swalmen–Roermond

External links

NS website 
Dutch public transport travel planner 

Railway stations in Limburg (Netherlands)
Railway stations opened in 1862
Railway stations on the Staatslijn E
Buildings and structures in Roermond
Transport in Roermond
1862 establishments in the Netherlands
Railway stations in the Netherlands opened in the 19th century